Demecus Beach (born 28 December 1987), is an American rugby union player. His usual position is loose-head prop. He played for the Ohio Aviators in the American PRO Rugby competition and for the United States national rugby union team.

Early and personal life 
Beach is from Toledo, Ohio. He attended both Davenport University, Michigan and Life University, Georgia.

Career 
Beach was selected for the United States national rugby team for the 2016 ARC Championship. He made his test debut as a replacement against Chile on 20 February, and a week later won his second cap when he started the match against Brazil.

In February 2016 he signed to the new PRO Rugby North American competition where he represented the Ohio Aviators.

References

External links 
 http://en.espn.co.uk/other/rugby/player/287351.html
 http://usarugby.org/mens-eagles-players/item/demecus-beach?category_id=384

1987 births
Living people
American rugby union players
Ohio Aviators players
United States international rugby union players
Rugby union props